The Bursum Formation is a geologic formation in New Mexico. It preserves fossils dating back to the Early Permian period.

Description
It rests disconformably on the Atrasado Formation and grades into the overlying Abo Formation. It represents the transitional zone between the marine Madera Group and the continental Abo Formation.

The Red Tanks Member is composed mostly of variegated shale, mudstone, and siltstone of nonmarine origin, with some beds of marine limestone and shale forming six transgressive depositional sequences. Its type section is at Carrizo Arroyo. It is also present at Abo Pass. The Bursum Formation has a more consistently marine character further south. The fact that the transgressive sequences are fewer in number than the cyclothems of the Pennsylvanian-Permian boundary in the North American mid-continent shows that tectonics had more influence on the development of this formation than glacial cycles.

Fossil content 
Fossils found in the formation include the fusulinid Triticites from which its early Permian age is determined. The formation also preserves fossils of the forams Bradyina lucida and Eostaffella.  There are two Lagerstätten in the Red Tanks Member at Carrizo Arroyo that are of early Asselian age, while the recent definition of the base of the Permian as the first appearance of the conodont Streptognathus isolatus pushes the earliest part of the formation, and the associated North American Wolfcampian Stage back into the latest Pennsylvanian.

The Red Tanks Member also contains biogenic carbonate nodules (oncolites) at Cibola Spring in a distinctive, widespread limestone horizon. These are unusual in being composed mostly of forams rather than cyanobacteria and are interpreted as having formed in a shelf environment below the euphotic zone or normal wave base but above the storm wave base.

History of investigation 
The Bursum Formation was first defined by R.H. Wilpolt and coinvestigators in 1946 for exposures near the Bursum triangulation point in the northern Jornada del Muerto and in the Los Pinos Mountains. They assigned the formation to the (now-defunct) Magdalena Group. M.L. Thompson later redefined the formation as including all Permian beds older than the Abo Formation, characterizing these as transitional beds between the marine beds of the Madera Group and the Abo Formation. D.A. Myers assigned the formation to the Madera Group in 1972. In his revision of Pennsylvanian stratigraphy in New Mexico in 2001, Barry S. Kues retained this assignment, except in the Joyita Hills. He also correlated the formation with the Laborcita Formation and Red Tanks Formation (which he regarded as a separate formation).

See also 

 List of fossiliferous stratigraphic units in New Mexico
 Paleontology in New Mexico

References

Bibliography 
 
 
 
 
 
 
 
 

Permian formations of New Mexico
Permian System of North America
Asselian
Limestone formations of the United States
Mudstone formations
Lacustrine deposits
Permian paleotropical deposits
Paleontology in New Mexico